A Promise (translit. Ningen no yakusoku) is a 1986 Japanese drama film directed by Yoshishige Yoshida. It was screened in the Un Certain Regard section at the 1986 Cannes Film Festival.

Cast
 Rentarō Mikuni as Ryosaku Morimoto
 Sachiko Murase as Tatsu, Ryosaku's wife
 Choichiro Kawarazaki as Yoshio, Ryosaku's son
 Orie Satoh as Ritsuko, Yoshio's wife
 Kōichi Satō as Detective Yoshikawa
 Tetta Sugimoto as Takao, Yoshio's son
 Reiko Tajima as Saeko Nogawa
 Choei Takahashi as Takeya Nakamura
 Kumiko Takeda as Naoko, Yoshio's daughter
 Tomisaburo Wakayama as Detective Tagami
 Masakane Yonekura as Detective Miura

References

External links

1986 films
1986 drama films
Japanese drama films
1980s Japanese-language films
Films directed by Yoshishige Yoshida
1980s Japanese films